Rick Berry (born 1978) is a Canadian former ice hockey player.

Rick Berry may also refer to:
Rick Berry (artist) (born 1953), American expressionistic figure artist
Ricky Berry (1964–1989), American basketball player in the 1980s

See also
Rick Barry (born 1944), American basketball player inducted in the Naismith Memorial Basketball Hall of Fame
Richard Berry (disambiguation)